Beatriz Fernández Ibáñez (born 19 March 1985) is a former Spanish handball player who was member of the Spanish national team.

Fernández played on the  Spanish team at the 2008 European Women's Handball Championship, where Spain reached the final, after defeating Germany in the semifinal.  She was also part of the team that won silver at the 2014 European Women's Handball Championship.  She was also part of the 2012 Olympic team that won the bronze medal.

References

External links

1985 births
Living people
Sportspeople from Santander, Spain
Handball players from Cantabria
Spanish female handball players
Olympic medalists in handball
Olympic handball players of Spain
Handball players at the 2012 Summer Olympics
Olympic bronze medalists for Spain
Medalists at the 2012 Summer Olympics
Expatriate handball players
Spanish expatriate sportspeople in France
Mediterranean Games competitors for Spain
Competitors at the 2009 Mediterranean Games
21st-century Spanish women